Victoria Serena Pickett (born August 12, 1996) is a Canadian soccer player who plays as a midfielder for NJ/NY Gotham FC in the National Women's Soccer League (NWSL) and the Canada national team.

Early life 
Pickett started playing soccer at age four with Barrie SC. When she was 13, she joined Glen Shields SC. She was named the Barrie Sports Athlete of the Year in 2015.

College career 
She played college soccer for the Wisconsin Badgers. In 2018, Pickett made the women's semifinalist list for the Hermann Trophy, an annual award for college soccer players. In 2019, she suffered a serious knee injury, tearing five ligaments, keeping her out of action until 2021. Despite the knee injury in 2019, Pickett appeared in 57 games across her college career, scoring 5 goals and providing 11 assists.

Club career 
In 2017, she played for Aurora FC in League1 Ontario, scoring in her debut against West Ottawa SC. She finished the season with two goals in eight appearances.

Pickett was drafted 15th overall by Kansas City in the 2021 NWSL Draft. In March, she signed her first professional contract, signing a three year contract with Kansas City. She scored her first goal on August 14, 2021, to lead her team to a 1-0 victory over the OL Reign, for the franchise's first ever NWSL victory. She was nominated for the NWSL Rookie of the Year Award in 2021.

On August 22, 2022, the Kansas City Current traded Pickett to NJ/NY Gotham FC in exchange for $200,000 in allocation money and a first-round draft pick in the 2023 NWSL Draft.

International career 
When Pickett was 15 years old, she entered the Canadian youth program. She participated in the Women's Under 17 Championships at the 2012 Confederation of North, Central America, and Caribbean Association Football (CONCACAF), where she helped Canada win a silver medal.

In 2015, Pickett scored the deciding goal for Canada during the CONCACAF U-20 championship.

Pickett played as a defender for Canada in the 2015 Pan Am Games.

References

External links 

 
 Wisconsin profile

1996 births
Living people
Women's association football midfielders
Canadian women's soccer players
Canadian sportspeople of Filipino descent
Wisconsin Badgers women's soccer players
Canadian expatriate women's soccer players
Canadian expatriate sportspeople in the United States
Expatriate women's soccer players in the United States
Kansas City Current draft picks
Kansas City Current players
NJ/NY Gotham FC players
National Women's Soccer League players
Aurora FC (Canada) players
Canada women's international soccer players
Footballers at the 2015 Pan American Games